The Col de Palaquit (altitude ) is a mountain pass situated in the Chartreuse Mountains in the  Isère department of France, near the village of Sarcenas. The Tour de France cycle race crossed the col for the first time on Stage 13 of the 2014 race. The pass is located on the climb via the D512 from Grenoble to the Col de Porte which has been used regularly by the Tour de France.

Cycle racing

Details of climb
From Saint-Égrève, to the south-west, the climb travels via the D105 to the village of Quaix-en-Chartreuse before dropping down again to join the D57.

After leaving Saint-Égrève, the climb has sections in excess of 10% before a descent after Quaix-en-Chartreuse. The final section has several hairpins separated by 12% ramps.

The col can also be accessed direct from Grenoble via Le Sappey-en-Chartreuse, using the D512.

Tour de France
On 18 July 2014, the Tour de France cycle race crossed the col for the first time en route from Saint-Étienne to Chamrousse. The leader over the summit was the Italian, Alessandro De Marchi. On the descent, Jakob Fuglsang crashed, putting him out of contention for a podium place.

References

Mountain passes of Auvergne-Rhône-Alpes
Isère